Ole Arvid Langnes (born 16 July 1971) is a retired Norwegian football goalkeeper.

He started his career in IK Grand Bodø, and was a reserve goalkeeper in FK Bodø/Glimt before joining Bærum SK in 1992. In 1994, he joined Bodø/Glimt from Ski IL. Ahead of the 1996 season he joined Kongsvinger IL. He only missed four games in his first four seasons, and was ever-present in 1997 and 1998. His downturn came in 2001 and 2002, when he played only 20 of 56 league games. He rejoined Bodø/Glimt ahead of the 2003 season. In the first half of 2004 he was loaned out to FK Fauske/Sprint. His career ended in mid-2006 after an injury.

In July 2007 in Misvær he married businesswoman Inger Ellen Nicolaisen.

References

1971 births
Living people
Sportspeople from Bodø
Norwegian footballers
Bærum SK players
FK Bodø/Glimt players
Kongsvinger IL Toppfotball players
Eliteserien players

Association football goalkeepers